The AJS Model 20 was a British motorcycle made by Associated Motorcycles at the former Matchless works in Plumstead, London. The Model 20 was finally discontinued when the 646 cc AJS Model 31 replaced it in the autumn of 1958.

Development
The AJS Model 20 and corresponding Matchless G9 were launched at the post war Earls Court motorcycle show in late 1948. Initially for export to the US, it was not until the late summer of 1949 that the first examples reached the home market. The styling was modern and the dual seat, megaphone silencers and bright chrome finish justified the name of Spring Twin. The rest of the cycle parts were standard AMC, with the engine being housed in a pivoted fork frame with telescopic front forks. The basic design changed little over the course of the next few years, the most significant change being made in 1952 when a new Burman gearbox was adopted.

In 1951, the rear suspension was upgraded to the Jampot unit, derided for its shape in the 28 September issue of the Motor Cycle magazine. In the same year minor changes included a new Lucas horn-push on the handlebar and a medallion badge in place of the previously used transfer. Front fork shuttle damping was also replaced with rod and damper-type.

Progressively developed, the Model 20's twin-cylinder engine underwent a number of capacity increases, finally being discontinued when the 646cc AJS Model 31 replaced it in the autumn of 1958.

See also
List of motorcycles of the 1940s
List of motorcycles of the 1950s

References

External links
 Picture of AJS Model 20

Model 20
Motorcycles introduced in the 1940s